Kustaa Gideon Vilkuna (born 26 October 1902 in Nivala – died 6 April 1980 in Kirkkonummi) was a Finnish ethnologist, linguist and historian. Vilkuna was a member of the Academic Karelia Society (AKS) until resigning in 1932 and again from 1942–1944. He was appointed a professor of ethnology at the University of Helsinki in 1950. In politics, he was a member of the Agrarian League and the Minister of Education in Reino Kuuskoski's cabinet. He was also closely associated with then-president Urho Kekkonen, being even described as the éminence grise of Kekkonen.

His daughter Kirsti Vilkuna is the widow of the prominent Finnish industrialist Pekka Herlin. His grandsons Janne Vilkuna and Kustaa H. J. Vilkuna are historians as well.

References

External links
 Kustaa Vilkuna in 375 humanists – 12 April 2015. Faculty of Arts, University of Helsinki.

1902 births
1980 deaths
People from Nivala
People from Oulu Province (Grand Duchy of Finland)
Centre Party (Finland) politicians
Ministers of Education of Finland
Finnish ethnologists
Linguists from Finland
University of Helsinki alumni
Academic staff of the University of Helsinki
20th-century linguists